Princess Norodom Marie Ranariddh (née Eng; born 21 December 1948) is the first wife of Prince Norodom Ranariddh, Prime Minister of Cambodia from 1993 to 1997. She was President of the Cambodian Red Cross from 1994 to 1998.

References

1948 births
Living people
Cambodian princesses
Cambodian people of Chinese descent
Cambodian Cham people
FUNCINPEC politicians
House of Norodom
Spouses of prime ministers of Cambodia
Princesses by marriage